John Harold Harrow (1 April 1921 – 18 October 1961) was an Australian rules footballer who played with Fitzroy in the Victorian Football League (VFL).

Family
Te son of Samuel Robert Kenyon Harrow (1890–1974), and Elsie Marietta Harrow (1892–1988), née Orsino, John Harold Harrow was born at Carlton North, Victoria on 1 April 1921.

He married Valerie Kathleen Barton (1921–1996), at Marysville, Victoria on 15 April 1944.

Death
He died at the Heidelberg Repatriation Hospital on 18 October 1961.

Notes

References	
 
 World War Two Nominal Roll: Warrant Officer John Harold Harrow (205920), Department of Veterans' Affairs.
 A9301, 205920: World War Two Service Record: Warrant Officer John Harold Harrow (205920), (documents not yet examined for release), National Archives of Australia.

External links 		
		

	
		
		
1921 births		
1961 deaths		
Australian rules footballers from Victoria (Australia)		
Fitzroy Football Club players
Royal Australian Air Force personnel of World War II